Peter Schenk the Younger (born 15 February 1693 in Amsterdam; died: 14 January 1775) was a Dutch engraver and map publisher active in Leipzig.

He was the son of the engraver and map publisher Peter Schenk the Elder who owned a shop in Leipzig and travelled regularly between there and Amsterdam in the 17th century. In 1715 Peter the Younger traveled to Leipzig in order to sell some paintings by Jan van Huchtenburgh and Jan and Willem van Mieris.

External links 
 Works by or about Peter Schenk II in the catalog of the Deutschen Nationalbibliothek

 Peter Wiegand: Schenk, Peter II., in: Martina Schattkowsky (ed.): Sächsische Biografie, Institut für Sächsische Geschichte und Volkskunde e.V.

1693 births
1775 deaths
Engravers from Amsterdam